Namgar (Buryat: Намгар) is a 4-piece music group that performs traditional Buryat and Mongolian music.

Its leader Namgar Lhasaranova comes from the east borderland where three countries, Russia, Mongolia, and China meet. She inherited a rich singing tradition of the Buryat people who reside in Russian regions of Buryatia and Agin Buryat Region. The group necessarily comprises singing of Namgar Lhasaranova and instrumentalists from Mongolia. Instruments of the group include morin khuur, chanza, traditional percussion, etc.

Background 
Namgar Lhasaranova performed solo or with modern groups at local and international venues since 1980 in a variety of genres including traditional songs, jazz and pop. It was in 2001 in Moscow that she and Evgeny Zolotarev (also spelled Zolotaryov) created a permanent group inviting Mongolian musicians Kh. Altangerel on morin khuur and Jamyangiin Urantögs on yatga.

Their notable distinction from Mongolian groups are dance tunes extinct in Mongolia since 17th century, and the endorsement of Buryat tradition with minimum inclusion of songs from 20th century.

History 
Launching Moscow concerts in March 2001, the group performed at the international festival Riddu Riđđu (Norway) in July 2001 along with Hedningarna, Wimme, Sainkho Namtchylak, Mari Boine, Chirgilchin etc. The collaboration with the festival continues until today (2008), while the group became the official representative of the festival in Russia.

There were several appearances of the group at Russia's major TV channels and concert venues. For some years they would also open exhibitions of a leading Buryat sculptor Dashi Namdakov in Moscow.

Namgar's debut CD titled Hatar (Dance), was recorded and issued in October 2003 by Moscow World Music label Sketis Music. It attracted several international reviews, including Dirty Linen that would endorse both the music and the cover design by Dashi Namdakov (selecting just 2 CDs out of half a dozen Sketis CDs directed to them for review).

In 2005 Namgar performed at the Rainforest world music festival in Malaysia, in 2007 at Shark Taronalari festival in Uzbekistan, and in 2008 at Alianait Art Festival in Canada.

In 2006–2007, Namgar were invited to take part in two film soundtracks by Alexei Aigui and his Ensemble 4'33". One of these works was for TV detective serial Syschik Putilin (2007), partly staged in Mongolia, and its CD included three tracks by the group, issued as Alexei Aigui / The Prince Of The Wind. Ensemble 4'33", Moscow Film Orchestra, 2008.

In late 2000s, they evolved their repertoire to include compositions with strongly changing rhythm and key. In late 2008, they completed a new album Nomad that comprises songs in at least three styles: traditional Mongolian/Buryat music, pop music, and ethno-rock.

They opened 2009 with their first visit to the US for NYC's GlobalFest. On January 9, they were on air on WFMU radio in Transpacific Sound Paradise, played at globalFEST at Webster Hall on January 10, 2010, making it to the New York Times, and on January 12, they played in Kennedy Center for the Performing Arts in Washington, D.C., getting back to New York on January 14 to play at the Shrine.

In 2012, Namgar returned to New York City for an exclusive chamber engagement at 287 Spring Art Gallery & Performing Space in SoHo (www.287Spring.com).

In September 2012 in Hannover, Germany, Namgar completed their new album The Dawn of the Foremothers, produced by Markus Reuter, with guest musicians Benni Schäfer, Tobias Reber, Alex Anthony Faide, Vlad Oboronko, and Enkhjargal Dandarvaanchig.

At the Riddu Riddu festival 2013, in order to complement Namgar Lhasaranova's voice and to provide an exciting contrast, Namgar went into a musical liaison with Sami singer Niillas Holmberg. For this collaboration, the Norwegian musician Ole Jørn Myklebust created a new repertoire by rearranging traditional music from Buryatia, to which he added own, completely new compositions. The lyrics for the new music pieces were written by the Buryatian poet Bayan Gunzinov with the help of Niillas and Namgar Lhasaranova.

Under the new band name Nordic Namgar, a new album with the title Running Horses was finally released in 2014 from live recordings of the 2013 Riddu Riđđu music festival. In the new band's line-up are Namgar Lhasaranova (vocals), Niillas Holmberg (vocals), Ole Jørn Myklebust (trumpet, xaphoon, vocals), Fredrik Ellingsen (guitar, electronics), Kjetil Dalland (bass), Herman Rundberg (drums, percussion) and Evgeny Zolotarev (chanza).

References

О.П.Лешев,журнал"Буквица"Канада.Ванкувер.рассказ о Намгар
Наталия ЛЯЛИНА."Академия на курьих ножках" ритмы монгольских кочевников в мультикультурном Сиэтле
 Константин Куц,Моковский Комсомолец Намгар 10 лет
25 ноября 2009, [«Аргументы Недели», Наталья СТРЕБНЕВА."Наследница бескрайних степей"

External links 
 Namgar on Red Orange Arts Agency
 Official homepage Namgar
 NAMGAR on MySpace Music

In scholarly papers 
 Newyear, Tristra. Crossing Borders: Buryat Traditional Music in the Post-Soviet Era \\ Harvard Asia Quarterly, Winter 2000, Vol. IV, No.1

Buryat music
Russian world music groups
Musical groups established in 2001